The Lace Market is a historic quarter-mile square area of Nottingham, England. It was the centre of the world's lace industry during the British Empire and is now a protected heritage area. It was an area of salesrooms and warehouses for storing, displaying and selling the lace. The Lace Market adjoins Hockley, and both areas now accommodate a variety of bars, restaurants and shops.

History

Once the heart of the world's lace industry during the days of the British Empire, it is full of impressive examples of 19th-century industrial architecture and thus is a protected heritage area.  It was never a market in the sense of having stalls, but there were salesrooms and warehouses for storing, displaying and selling the lace.
Most of the area is typical Victorian, with densely packed 4–7 storey red-brick building lined streets. Iron railings, old gas lamps and red phone boxes a plenty also help give the through walker a sense of going back in time to Victorian England. The Adams Building (now part of the City campus of Nottingham College) was designed by Thomas Chambers Hine and was built for Thomas Adams, a notable Quaker who did much to improve the typical Victorian working conditions in his factories.

There are some non Victorian parts to the area as well though, such as High Pavement which is a handsome Georgian street and home to the Galleries of Justice and St Mary's Church.

The area is sited on the area of the original Saxon settlement that became Nottingham, and also boasts the oldest Christian Foundation in the city, predating the Norman Conquest. St Mary's, on High Pavement is believed to be the third church to have stood there but was itself completed in 1474 and is an excellent example of early English Perpendicular architecture.

Another fine piece of architecture in the area is a warehouse designed by Watson Fothergill, a prolific local architect responsible for some 100 buildings in the area between 1870 and 1906.  His work in the Gothic revival and Old English vernacular styles was very popular in Victorian times, and means that many shops, banks, houses and even churches are enlivened by turrets, gargoyles, mock Tudor beams and other distinctive features.

Every large British city has been affected by the decline of traditional industries. Once the principal engine of Nottingham's growth, the Lace Market powered a hosiery industry with 25,000 mostly female workers at its peak in the 1890s. Lace declined as technology changed and the working population fell below 5,000 in the 1970s with many of the factories becoming derelict and the area falling into decline. The Lace Market has undergone a renaissance and become a flagship for the city's post industrial regeneration. This change started in 1978 when Nottingham City Council led the Operation Clean Up programme offering public grants to building owners to refurbish their historic buildings. Nearly all of the old warehouses that were once run down have now been cleaned and renovated and have found new uses such as luxury apartments, high-spec offices and academic buildings. Several PR and design agencies, as well as technology companies, have made the Lace Market their home.

Some streets in the Lace Market are now tourist attractions, such as the National Justice Museum on High Pavement. The Galleries are located in the old law courts and County Gaol (jail) – or County Goal as the stonemason accidentally inscribed it, a blunder still visible today above the entrance which ironically probably got the poor stonemason severely punished. There has been a court on the site since 1375, with the present Georgian building being used since 1780.

Some of the original 19th-century lace machines are still in use today, often interfaced with computers.  Tours of the area and some of the old buildings are available.

Tram stop
The area is served by a Nottingham Express Transit's Lace Market tram stop on Fletcher Gate.

References

External links 

History of Nottinghamshire
Areas of Nottingham
Garment districts
Lace
Conservation areas in Nottinghamshire